Eritoran is an investigational drug for the treatment of severe sepsis, an excessive inflammatory response to an infection.

In a phase III clinical trial, eritoran did not perform better than placebo for the treatment of sepsis.

It was being developed by the Japanese pharmaceutical company Eisai Co. and administered intravenously as the sodium salt eritoran tetrasodium.

Mechanism of action
Toll-like receptors (TLRs) play an important role in the innate immune system. They recognise microbes and activate inflammatory immune responses. Toll-like receptor 4 (TLR4) detects lipopolysaccharides found in most Gram-negative bacteria.

Because of its similarity to the lipopolysaccharide lipid A, eritoran acts as TLR4 antagonist and so blocks the excessive reaction triggered by this receptor.

Cytokine storm
While eritoran did not perform well in the treatment of sepsis, it was shown to combat another, related phenomenon called cytokine storm in influenza cases involving certain virus strains (involving  preliminary experimentation on mice, not in other animals or humans, led by a University of Maryland School of Medicine researcher).A further study in mice and rats by the same group showed it prevented acute lung injury. A cytokine storm can help to cause sepsis and can in concert with it or by itself cause serious illness or death if not soon controlled. Mortality rates for sepsis, cytokine storm, and especially septic shock and organ dysfunction are still quite high despite progress made. This is in no small part due to the prevalence of nosocomial (hospital-acquired) infections, as well as ongoing mutations which confer multi-drug resistance in pathological microorganisms such as bacteria and viruses (most strains of flu are resistant to amantadine and rimantadine, and some are resistant to oseltamivir), and delays and mistakes in the recognition and treatment of disease. New flu strains, such as the H7N9 strain, are always emerging.

Eritoran, because of its structural similarity to the gram-negative bacterial lipopolysaccharide (lipid A) acts as TLR4 antagonist. Eritoran did not perform well in phase III clinical trials, however it successfully treated cytokine storm in influenza animal models.[8] There were multiple factors that could be attributed to the failure of Eritoran against sepsis, which include poorly designed lipid A scaffold, antagonist designed using mice model where as it is known that there exists species differences (human vs mice) in lipid A recognition, role of MD2/TLR4 PTMs on receptor function is not fully understood, recruitment of heterogeneous patient population, and lack of a well-defined structure activity relationship (SAR) of LPS interaction with MD2/TLR4.

References 

Immunosuppressants